Margaret Ismay was an opera singer. While a student at the Royal Academy of Music, she was awarded the Academy's Gilbert Betjemann Prize "for operatic singing" in 1909. She later had the medal converted into a coin watch by Cartier.

She appeared in The Balkan Princess in 1910.

In 2013 her great-nephew showed the medal on an episode of the BBC's Antiques Roadshow.

References 

Year of birth missing
Place of birth missing
Year of death missing
Place of death missing
20th-century British women opera singers